Jon Yong-chol (born 18 July 1974) is a North Korean former footballer. He represented North Korea on at least eighteen occasions between 1998 and 2003, scoring twice.

Career statistics

International

International goals
Scores and results list North Korea's goal tally first, score column indicates score after each North Korea goal.

References

1974 births
Living people
North Korean footballers
North Korea international footballers
Association football midfielders
Footballers at the 1998 Asian Games
2004 AFC Asian Cup players
Asian Games competitors for North Korea